Lauren Herring Cole (born July 23, 1993) is an American former tennis player.

She has career-high WTA rankings of 545 in singles, achieved June 2016, and 404 in doubles, set in July 2016.

Herring alongside Grace Min was given a wildcard for the women's doubles draw of the 2010 US Open where they lost in the first round to Dominika Cibulková and Anastasia Pavlyuchenkova.

ITF Circuit finals

Singles: 5 (2 titles, 3 runner-ups)

Doubles: 7 (1 title, 6 runner-ups)

References
 Georgia Bulldogs profile

External links
 
 

1993 births
Living people
American female tennis players
Tennis people from North Carolina
Sportspeople from Greenville, North Carolina
Georgia Lady Bulldogs tennis players